Yang Changling (born 11 March 1965) is a Chinese wrestler. He competed in the men's Greco-Roman 57 kg at the 1988 Summer Olympics.

References

1965 births
Living people
Chinese male sport wrestlers
Olympic wrestlers of China
Wrestlers at the 1988 Summer Olympics
Place of birth missing (living people)
Asian Games medalists in wrestling
Wrestlers at the 1990 Asian Games
Medalists at the 1990 Asian Games
Asian Games silver medalists for China
20th-century Chinese people
21st-century Chinese people